Pishchalnikov (masculine) or Pishchalnikova (feminine) is a Russian surname. Notable people with the surname include:

Bogdan Pishchalnikov (born 1982), Russian discus thrower
Darya Pishchalnikova (born 1985), Russian discus thrower
Kirill Pishchalnikov (born 1987), Russian basketball player

Russian-language surnames